Celine Rieder (born 18 January 2001) is a German swimmer. She competed in the women's 1500 metre freestyle event at the 2017 World Aquatics Championships.

References

External links
 

2001 births
Living people
German female swimmers
Swimmers at the 2018 Summer Youth Olympics
Place of birth missing (living people)
German female freestyle swimmers
Swimmers at the 2020 Summer Olympics
Olympic swimmers of Germany
21st-century German women